The Pro-Death Penalty Party was a minor South African political party formed around the single issue of restoring the death penalty, abolished in South Africa in 1995.

The party contested for the Gauteng legislature in the 2004 elections, earning 0.05% of the vote and failing to win a seat.

The party did not contest any further elections.

Provincial elections

References

2004 establishments in South Africa
Defunct political parties in South Africa
Political parties established in 2004
Political parties with year of disestablishment missing